The Ronald Kirk Bridge is a pedestrian bridge over the Trinity River in Dallas, Texas. It connects Downtown Dallas and West Dallas, paralleling the 2012 Margaret Hunt Hill Bridge for vehicles, and the 1930 Texas and Pacific Railway Trinity River Bridge.

History
Constructed as the Lamar-McKinney Viaduct in 1933, the original road bridge was built to carry vehicles across the periodically swelling Trinity River to West Dallas. It was completed 27 years after the river's 1908 flood that submerged most of the area.

The bridge was renamed the Ronald Kirk Bridge in 2016 from its former name, the Continental Avenue Bridge. It was renamed in honor of the first African-American mayor of Dallas, Ronald Kirk.

Restoration
The bridge had fallen into a state of disrepair by 2010, when plans were being developed to reconstruct Continental Avenue and the bridge. During the reconstruction of the bridge it was decided that there was no need for it to carry vehicular traffic, since the nearby Margaret Hunt Hill Bridge was completed in 2012 to do so. The design as a footbridge complemented the nearby open park plan for Klyde Warren Park, as a recreation amenity.

The Ronald Kirk Bridge reopened on Sunday, June 15, 2014 (Father's Day). It opened with a playground, a splash park, lounge chairs, human-sized chess boards, and a ceiling of cloth to shade the area, along with many trails surrounding the bridge in the Trinity River Basin and on the levees.

This bridge is part of the greater Trinity River Project.

See also

List of bridges on the National Register of Historic Places in Texas
List of bridges documented by the Historic American Engineering Record in Texas
National Register of Historic Places listings in Dallas County, Texas

References

External links

Bridges in Dallas
Pedestrian bridges in Texas
Trinity River (Texas)
Historic American Engineering Record in Texas
Road bridges on the National Register of Historic Places in Texas
National Register of Historic Places in Dallas
Former road bridges in the United States